Junction City is a city in Union County, Arkansas, United States, and is the twin city of neighboring Junction City, Louisiana. The population was 581 at the 2010 census.

Geography
Junction City is located at  (33.019174, -92.722915). It is the southernmost settlement in the state of Arkansas.

Demographics

2020 census

As of the 2020 United States census, there were 503 people, 271 households, and 202 families residing in the city.

2000 census
At the 2000 census there were 721 people in 251 households, including 186 families, in the city. The racial makeup of the city was 55.20% White, 43.00% Black or African American, 0.55% Native American, 0.14% Asian, and 1.11% from two or more races.  0.69% of the population were Hispanic or Latino of any race.
Of the 251 households 34.3% had children under the age of 18 living with them, 53.4% were married couples living together, 15.5% had a female householder with no husband present, and 25.5% were non-families. 23.1% of households were one person and 13.5% were one person aged 65 or older.  The average household size was 2.71 and the average family size was 3.17.

The age distribution was 29.1% under the age of 18, 9.0% from 18 to 24, 22.3% from 25 to 44, 21.4% from 45 to 64, and 18.2% 65 or older.  The median age was 36 years. For every 100 females, there were 102.5 males.  For every 100 females age 18 and over, there were 92.1 males.

The median household income was $27,981 and the median family income  was $29,107. Males had a median income of $30,000 versus $15,313 for females. The per capita income for the city was $11,803.  About 24.1% of families and 31.7% of the population were below the poverty line, including 40.5% of those under age 18 and 26.4% of those age 65 or over.

Education 
Public education for early childhood, elementary and secondary students is primarily provided by the Junction City School District, which includes:

 Junction City Elementary School, serving prekindergarten through grade 6.
 Junction City High School, serving grades 7 through 12.

References

Cities in Arkansas
Cities in Union County, Arkansas